Escala scharrerae is a species of cockroach found in Australia.

References

Cockroaches
Insects described in 1991